Edward Earl Husmann (August 6, 1931 - August 30, 2018) was an American football defensive tackle in the American Football League (AFL) for the Houston Oilers. He also played in the National Football League (NFL) for the Chicago Cardinals and Dallas Cowboys. He played college football at the University of Nebraska.

Early years
Husmann attended Ogallala High School, earning All-state and All-conference honors as a senior in football. He also played basketball, ran track and wrestled.

He walked-on to the University of Nebraska. He became a starter as a senior, at right tackle on both sides of the ball. He was also a member of the wrestling team, and won the Big Seven Conference heavyweight wrestling championship as a senior.

In 2004, he was inducted into the Nebraska Football Hall of Fame. In 2006, he was inducted into the Nebraska High School Hall of Fame.

Professional career

Chicago Cardinals
Husmann was selected by the Chicago Cardinals in the ninth round (99th overall) of the 1953 NFL Draft and began his career on the offensive line. He spent the next two years out of football, while serving his military service in the United States Army. He returned to the team in 1956.

Dallas Cowboys
He was selected by the Dallas Cowboys in the 1960 NFL Expansion Draft. He became the first starter at right defensive tackle in franchise history. He was waived on September 5, 1961.

Houston Oilers
In 1961, he was signed as a free agent by the Houston Oilers and was used at defensive tackle and defensive end. That year, he played a key role in the team winning their second straight championship and was the runner-up to Billy Cannon in the MVP voting for the title game.

He was released on August 8, 1966. He left with the franchise single-game sack record (4). During his professional career, he played every line position, offensive and defensive, except for center.

Edmonton Eskimos (CFL)
In 1966, he signed with the Edmonton Eskimos of the Canadian Football League.

Personal life
Husmann died on August 30, 2018, in Austin, Texas at the age of 87.

References

External links
Nebraska Corn Huskers bio
Nebraska High School Hall of Fame bio

1931 births
2018 deaths
People from Schuyler, Nebraska
Players of American football from Nebraska
American football defensive linemen
Nebraska Cornhuskers football players
Nebraska Cornhuskers wrestlers
Chicago Cardinals players
Dallas Cowboys players
Houston Oilers players
Edmonton Elks players
American Football League All-Star players
American Football League players
United States Army soldiers